Bandeau Creek is a  long 1st order tributary to the Cape Fear River in Bladen County, North Carolina.

Course
Bandeau Creek rises on the Hog Bay divide about 0.25 miles southeast of Lagoon, North Carolina.  Bandeau Creek then flows south to join the Cape Fear River at Jessups Landing.

Watershed
Bandeau Creek drains  of area, receives about 50.0 in/year of precipitation, has a wetness index of 577.91 and is about 21% forested.

See also
List of rivers of North Carolina

References

Rivers of North Carolina
Rivers of Bladen County, North Carolina
Tributaries of the Cape Fear River